Sakizaya is a Formosan language closely related to Amis. One of the large family of Austronesian languages, it is spoken by the Sakizaya people, who are concentrated on the eastern Pacific coast of Taiwan. Since 2007 they have been recognized by the Taiwan government as one of the sixteen distinct indigenous groups on the island.

History 
Scholars mistakenly categorised the Sakizaya language as a dialect of Amis.

In 2002, the Center of Aboriginal Studies of National Chengchi University in Taiwan corrected this error when they edited the indigenous languages textbooks. That year, the Sakizaya language was designated both as a Chilai and Amis sublanguage. Both are included in the family of Austronesian languages. On 17 January 2007, the Sakizaya community became the thirteenth distinct indigenous ethnic group recognised by the Taiwanese government.

A total of 985 people are registered as Sakizaya. They live primarily in the Takubuwan, Sakur, Maifor and Kaluluwan communities. Thousands of other Sakizaya are still registered as Amis, based on historic classifications. Around half of Amis politicians in Hualien City, the biggest city in the Amis area, are said to be ethnic Sakizaya.

See also

Sakizaya people

References

Bibliography

External links
 Yuánzhùmínzú yǔyán xiànshàng cídiǎn 原住民族語言線上詞典  – Sakizaya search page at the "Aboriginal language online dictionary" website of the Indigenous Languages Research and Development Foundation
 Sakizaya teaching and leaning materials published by the Council of Indigenous Peoples of Taiwan 
 Sakizaya translation of President Tsai Ing-wen's 2016 apology to indigenous people – published on the website of the presidential office

Formosan languages
Languages of Taiwan
Endangered Austronesian languages